Ards Borough Council was the local authority of Ards in Northern Ireland. It merged with North Down Borough Council in May 2015 under local government reorganisation in Northern Ireland to become North Down and Ards District Council.

Population
The area covered by Ards Borough Council had a population of 78,078 residents according to the 2011 Northern Ireland census.

References

 
District councils of Northern Ireland, 1973–2015